Eleonora Dominici (born 22 February 1996) is an Italian racewalker.

Career
As well as Eleonora Giorgi, Antonella Palmisano, Valentina Trapletti, Mariavittoria Becchetti has established the minimum for the qualification for the Tokyo 2021 Olympics, set by the World Athletics at 1:31:00 to be achieved from 1 January 2019 to 31 May 2021. It will therefore be the Italian national team coach, Antonio La Torre to choose which will be the three athletes (maximum number allowed for each race) who will be able to represent the country at the Olympic Games.

Achievements
Senior

See also
 Italian team at the running events
 Italy at the IAAF World Race Walking Cup
 Italy at the European Race Walking Cup

References

External links
 

1996 births
Living people
Athletes from Rome
Italian female racewalkers